Acatzingo Municipality is a municipality in Puebla in south-eastern Mexico.

The BUAP has a Regional Section there.

Climate

References

Municipalities of Puebla